El Daba is a village and rail station about 180 km West of Alexandria by road. RAF El Daba (otherwise Desert Landing Ground 105) is a former Royal Air Force military airfield located approximately 4.6 kilometres south-southeast of the village.
El Daba was a pre–World War II airfield, one of a number of DLGs created in the Western Desert of Egypt after the Munich Crisis of the late 1930s. During World War II, it was used as a military airfield by the British Royal Air Force and the United States Army Air Forces during the North African Campaign against Axis forces, and by the Luftwaffe.

Royal Air Force Squadrons which used the airfield between 1939 and 1943 were
No's 30, 33, 45, 73, 74 113, 211.

USAAF Ninth Air Force units which used the airfield were:

 57th Fighter Group, 5–8 November 1942, P-40 Warhawk

After the war, El Daba appears to have been closed about 1946. Today, the area is heavily used by agriculture.  There is no evidence of the airfield's existence.

British Coordinates
 LG-105

See also
 List of World War II North Africa Airfields

References

 Maurer, Maurer. Air Force Combat Units of World War II. Maxwell AFB, Alabama: Office of Air Force History, 1983. .
 
 Wisdom TH. Wings Over Olympus London, George Allen & Unwin 1942
 Royal Air Force Airfield Creation for the Western Desert Campaign
 1:250,000 Egypt and Cyrenaica Sheet 14 El Daba 1942 (MLRS Map Reprints)

External links

Royal Air Force stations in Egypt
Royal Air Force stations of World War II in Egypt
Airfields of the United States Army Air Forces in Egypt
World War II airfields in Egypt
Defunct airports in Egypt
Military airbases established in 1939